This is a list of microlepidoptera which are found in Great Britain. It also acts as an index to the species articles and forms part of the full List of moths of Great Britain.

Micropterigidae
Micropterix tunbergella (Fabricius, 1784)
Micropterix mansuetella Zeller, 1844
Micropterix aureatella (Scopoli, 1763)
Micropterix aruncella (Scopoli, 1763)
Micropterix calthella (Linnaeus, 1761)

Eriocraniidae
Eriocrania subpurpurella (Haworth, 1828)
Eriocrania chrysolepidella Zeller, 1851
Eriocrania unimaculella (Zetterstedt, 1839)
Eriocrania sparrmannella (Bosc, 1791)
Eriocrania salopiella (Stainton, 1854)
Eriocrania cicatricella (Zetterstedt, 1839)
Eriocrania sangii (Wood, 1891)
Eriocrania semipurpurella (Stephens, 1835)

Nepticulidae
Ectoedemia decentella (Herrich-Schäffer, 1855)
Ectoedemia sericopeza (Zeller, 1839)
Ectoedemia louisella (Sircom, 1849)
Ectoedemia argyropeza (Zeller, 1839)
Ectoedemia turbidella (Zeller, 1848)
Ectoedemia hannoverella (Glitz, 1872)
Ectoedemia intimella (Zeller, 1848)
Ectoedemia agrimoniae (Frey, 1858)
Ectoedemia spinosella (de Joannis, 1908)
Ectoedemia angulifasciella (Stainton, 1849)
Ectoedemia atricollis (Stainton, 1857)
Ectoedemia arcuatella (Herrich-Schäffer, 1855)
Ectoedemia rubivora (Wocke, 1860)
Ectoedemia erythrogenella (de Joannis, 1907)
Ectoedemia occultella (Linnaeus, 1767)
Ectoedemia minimella (Zetterstedt, 1839)
Ectoedemia quinquella (Bedell, 1848)
Ectoedemia heringella (Mariani, 1939)
Ectoedemia albifasciella (Heinemann, 1871)
Ectoedemia subbimaculella (Haworth, 1828)
Ectoedemia heringi (Toll, 1934)
Ectoedemia atrifrontella (Stainton, 1851)
Ectoedemia septembrella (Stainton, 1849)
Ectoedemia weaveri (Stainton, 1855)
Bohemannia auriciliella (de Joannis, 1908)
Bohemannia pulverosella (Stainton, 1849)
Bohemannia quadrimaculella (Boheman, 1851)
Trifurcula headleyella (Stainton, 1854)
Trifurcula subnitidella (Duponchel, 1843)
Trifurcula immundella (Zeller, 1839)
Trifurcula beirnei Puplesis, 1984
Trifurcula cryptella (Stainton, 1856)
Trifurcula eurema (Tutt, 1899)
Stigmella aurella (Fabricius, 1775)
Stigmella splendidissimella (Herrich-Schäffer, 1855)
Stigmella auromarginella (Richardson, 1890)
Stigmella pretiosa (Heinemann, 1862)
Stigmella aeneofasciella (Herrich-Schäffer, 1855)
Stigmella dryadella (Hofmann, 1868)
Stigmella filipendulae (Wocke, 1871)
Stigmella poterii (Stainton, 1857)
Stigmella tormentillella auctorum
Stigmella lemniscella (Zeller, 1839)
Stigmella continuella (Stainton, 1856)
Stigmella speciosa (Frey, 1858)
Stigmella sorbi (Stainton, 1861)
Stigmella plagicolella (Stainton, 1854)
Stigmella salicis (Stainton, 1854)
Stigmella obliquella (Heinemann, 1862)
Stigmella myrtillella (Stainton, 1857)
Stigmella zelleriella (Snellen, 1875)
Stigmella trimaculella (Haworth, 1828)
Stigmella assimilella (Zeller, 1848)
Stigmella floslactella (Haworth, 1828)
Stigmella carpinella (Heinemann, 1862)
Stigmella tityrella (Stainton, 1854)
Stigmella incognitella (Herrich-Schäffer, 1855)
Stigmella perpygmaeella (Doubleday, 1859)
Stigmella ulmivora (Fologne, 1860)
Stigmella hemargyrella (Kollar, 1832)
Stigmella paradoxa (Frey, 1858)
Stigmella atricapitella (Haworth, 1828)
Stigmella ruficapitella (Haworth, 1828)
Stigmella suberivora (Stainton, 1869)
Stigmella roborella (Johansson, 1971)
Stigmella svenssoni (Johansson, 1971)
Stigmella samiatella (Zeller, 1839)
Stigmella basiguttella (Heinemann, 1862)
Stigmella tiliae (Frey, 1856)
Stigmella minusculella (Herrich-Schäffer, 1855)
Stigmella anomalella (Goeze, 1783) rose leaf miner
Stigmella centifoliella (Zeller, 1848)
Stigmella spinosissimae (Waters, 1928)
Stigmella viscerella (Stainton, 1853)
Stigmella ulmiphaga Preissecker
Stigmella malella (Stainton, 1854) apple pygmy
Stigmella catharticella (Stainton, 1853)
Stigmella hybnerella (Hübner, 1796)
Stigmella oxyacanthella (Stainton, 1854)
Stigmella pyri (Glitz, 1865)
Stigmella aceris (Frey, 1857)
Stigmella nylandriella (Tengström, 1848)
Stigmella magdalenae (Klimesch, 1950)
Stigmella desperatella (Frey, 1856)
Stigmella torminalis (Wood, 1890)
Stigmella regiella (Herrich-Schäffer, 1855)
Stigmella crataegella (Klimesch, 1936)
Stigmella prunetorum (Stainton, 1855)
Stigmella betulicola (Stainton, 1856)
Stigmella microtheriella (Stainton, 1854)
Stigmella luteella (Stainton, 1857)
Stigmella sakhalinella Puplesis, 1984
Stigmella glutinosae (Stainton, 1858)
Stigmella alnetella (Stainton, 1856)
Stigmella lapponica (Wocke, 1862)
Stigmella confusella (Wood, 1894)
Enteucha acetosae (Stainton, 1854)

Opostegidae
Opostega salaciella (Treitschke, 1833)
Pseudopostega auritella (Hübner, 1813)
Pseudopostega crepusculella (Zeller, 1839)
Opostega spatulella Herrich-Schäffer, 1855

Tischeriidae
Tischeria ekebladella (Bjerkander, 1795)
Tischeria dodonaea Stainton, 1858
Emmetia marginea (Haworth, 1828)
Emmetia gaunacella (Duponchel, 1843)
Emmetia angusticollella (Duponchel, 1843)

Incurvariidae
Phylloporia bistrigella (Haworth, 1828)
Incurvaria pectinea Haworth, 1828
Incurvaria masculella ([Denis & Schiffermüller], 1775)
Incurvaria oehlmanniella (Hübner, 1796)
Incurvaria praelatella ([Denis & Schiffermüller], 1775)
Lampronia capitella (Clerck, 1759) currant shoot borer
Lampronia flavimitrella (Hübner, 1817)
Lampronia luzella (Hübner, 1817)
Lampronia corticella (Linnaeus, 1758) raspberry moth
Lampronia morosa (Zeller, 1852)
Lampronia fuscatella (Tengström, 1848)
Lampronia pubicornis (Haworth, 1828)
Nematopogon swammerdamella (Linnaeus, 1758)
Nematopogon schwarziellus (Zeller, 1839)
Nematopogon pilella ([Denis & Schiffermüller], 1775)
Nematopogon metaxella (Hübner, 1813)
Nemophora fasciella (Fabricius, 1775)
Nemophora minimella ([Denis & Schiffermüller], 1775)
Nemophora cupriacella (Hübner, 1819)
Nemophora metallica (Poda, 1761)
Nemophora degeerella (Linnaeus, 1758)
Adela cuprella ([Denis & Schiffermüller], 1775)
Adela reaumurella (Linnaeus, 1758)
Adela croesella (Scopoli, 1763)
Adela rufimitrella (Scopoli, 1763)
Adela fibulella ([Denis & Schiffermüller], 1775)

Heliozelidae
Heliozela sericiella (Haworth, 1828)
Heliozela resplendella (Stainton, 1851)
Heliozela hammoniella (Sorhagen, 1885)
Antispila metallella ([Denis & Schiffermüller], 1775)
Antispila treitschkiella (Fischer von Röslerstamm, 1843)

Psychidae
Narycia duplicella (Goeze, 1783)
Dahlica triquetrella (Hübner, 1813)
Dahlica inconspicuella (Stainton, 1849) lesser lichen case-bearer
Dahlica lichenella (Linnaeus, 1761) lichen case-bearer
Diplodoma laichartingella (Goeze, 1783)
Taleporia tubulosa (Retzius, 1783)
Bankesia conspurcatella (Zeller, 1850)
Bacotia claustrella (Bruand, 1845)
Luffia lapidella (Goeze, 1783)
Luffia ferchaultella (Stephens, 1850)
Psyche casta (Pallas, 1767)
Psyche crassiorella Bruand, 1850
Proutia betulina (Zeller, 1839)
Epichnopterix plumella ([Denis & Schiffermüller], 1775)
Epichnopterix retiella (Newman, 1847)
Acanthopsyche atra (Linnaeus, 1767)
Pachythelia villosella (Ochsenheimer, 1810)
Canephora hirsuta (Poda, 1761)
Thyridopteryx ephemeraeformis (Haworth, 1803)
Sterrhopteryx fusca (Haworth, 1809)

Tineidae
Morophaga choragella (Denis & Schiffermüller, 1775)
Euplocamus anthracinalis (Scopoli, 1763)
Dryadaula pactolia Meyrick, 1902
Psychoides verhuella Bruand, 1853
Psychoides filicivora (Meyrick, 1937)
Tenaga nigripunctella (Haworth, 1828)
Eudarcia richardsoni (Walsingham, 1900)
Infurcitinea argentimaculella (Stainton, 1849)
Infurcitinea albicomella (Stainton, 1851)
Ischnoscia borreonella (Millière, 1874)
Stenoptinea cyaneimarmorella (Herrich-Schäffer, 1854)
Myrmecozela ochraceella (Tengström, 1848)
Ateliotum insularis (Rebel, 1896)
Setomorpha rutella Zeller, 1852 tropical tobacco moth
Lindera tessellatella Blanchard, 1852
Haplotinea ditella (Pierce & Metcalfe, 1938)
Haplotinea insectella (Fabricius, 1794)
Cephimallota crassiflavella Bruand, 1851
Cephitinea colongella Zagulyaev, 1964
Nemapogon granella (Linnaeus, 1758) corn moth
Nemapogon cloacella (Haworth, 1828) cork moth
Nemapogon wolffiella Karsholt & Nielsen, 1976
Nemapogon variatella (Clemens, 1859)
Nemapogon ruricolella (Stainton, 1849)
Nemapogon clematella (Fabricius, 1781)
Nemapogon picarella (Clerck, 1759)
Archinemapogon yildizae Koçak, 1981
Nemaxera betulinella (Paykull, 1785)
Triaxomera parasitella (Hübner, 1796)
Triaxomera fulvimitrella (Sodoffsky, 1830)
Triaxomasia caprimulgella (Stainton, 1851)
Monopis laevigella ([Denis & Schiffermüller], 1775) skin moth
Monopis weaverella (Scott, 1858)
Monopis obviella (Denis & Schiffermüller, 1775)
Monopis crocicapitella (Clemens, 1859)
Monopis imella (Hübner, 1813)
Monopis monachella (Hübner, 1796)
Monopis fenestratella (Heyden, 1863)
Trichophaga tapetzella (Linnaeus, 1758) tapestry moth
Trichophaga mormopis Meyrick, 1935
Tineola bisselliella (Hummel, 1823) common clothes moth
Niditinea fuscella (Linnaeus, 1758) brown-dotted clothes moth
Niditinea striolella (Matsummura, 1931)
Tinea pellionella Linnaeus, 1758 case-bearing clothes moth
Tinea lanella Pierce & Metcalfe, 1934
Tinea translucens Meyrick, 1917
Tinea dubiella Stainton, 1859
Tinea flavescentella Haworth, 1828
Tinea pallescentella Stainton, 1851 large pale clothes moth
Tinea semifulvella Haworth, 1828
Tinea trinotella Thunberg, 1794
Tenaga pomiliella Clemens, 1862
Ceratophaga orientalis (Stainton, 1878)
Ceratophaga haidarabadi Zagulyaev, 1966

Ochsenheimeriidae
Ochsenheimeria taurella (Denis & Schiffermüller, 1775)
Ochsenheimeria urella Fischer von Röslerstamm, 1842
Ochsenheimeria vacculella Fischer von Röslerstamm, 1842

Lyonetiidae
Leucoptera laburnella (Stainton, 1851) laburnum leaf miner
Leucoptera spartifoliella (Hübner, 1813)
Leucoptera orobi (Stainton, 1869)
Leucoptera lathyrifoliella Stainton, 1866
Leucoptera lotella (Stainton, 1858)
Leucoptera malifoliella (Costa, 1836) pear leaf blister moth
Leucoptera sinuella (Reutti, 1853)
Lyonetia prunifoliella (Hübner, 1796)
Lyonetia clerkella (Linnaeus, 1758) apple leaf miner
Bedellia somnulentella (Zeller, 1847)

Bucculatrigidae
Bucculatrix cristatella (Zeller, 1839)
Bucculatrix nigricomella (Zeller, 1839)
Bucculatrix maritima Stainton, 1851
Bucculatrix humiliella Herrich-Schäffer, 1855
Bucculatrix artemisiella Herrich-Schäffer, 1855
Bucculatrix frangutella (Goeze, 1783)
Bucculatrix albedinella (Zeller, 1839)
Bucculatrix cidarella Zeller, 1839
Bucculatrix thoracella (Thunberg, 1794)
Bucculatrix ulmella Zeller, 1848
Bucculatrix bechsteinella (Bechstein & Scharfenberg, 1805)
Bucculatrix demaryella (Duponchel, 1840)

Hieroxestidae
Oinophila v-flava (Haworth, 1828) yellow v moth
Opogona sacchari (Bojer, 1856)
Opogona omoscopa (Meyrick, 1893)
Opogona antistacta Meyrick, 1937

Gracillariidae
Caloptilia cuculipennella (Hübner, 1796)
Caloptilia populetorum (Zeller, 1839)
Caloptilia elongella (Linnaeus, 1761)
Caloptilia betulicola (Hering, 1927)
Caloptilia rufipennella (Hübner, 1796)
Caloptilia azaleella (Brants, 1913) azalea leaf miner
Caloptilia alchimiella (Scopoli, 1763)
Caloptilia robustella Jäckh, 1972
Caloptilia stigmatella (Fabricius, 1781)
Caloptilia falconipennella (Hübner, 1813)
Caloptilia semifascia (Haworth, 1828)
Caloptilia hemidactylella ([Denis & Schiffermüller], 1775)
Caloptilia leucapennella (Stephens, 1835)
Caloptilia syringella (Fabricius, 1794)
Aspilapteryx tringipennella (Zeller, 1839)
Caloptilia hauderi (Rebel, 1906)
Calybites phasianipennella (Hübner, 1813)
Eucalybites auroguttella (Stephens, 1835)
Micrurapteryx kollariella (Zeller, 1839)
Parectopa ononidis (Zeller, 1839)
Parornix loganella (Stainton, 1848)
Parornix betulae (Stainton, 1854)
Parornix fagivora (Frey, 1861)
Parornix anglicella (Stainton, 1850)
Parornix devoniella (Stainton, 1850)
Parornix scoticella (Stainton, 1850)
Parornix alpicola (Wocke, 1876) (=Parornix leucostola Pelham-Clinton, 1964)
Parornix finitimella (Zeller, 1850)
Deltaornix torquillella (Zeller, 1850)
Callisto denticulella (Thunberg, 1794)
Dialectica imperialella (Zeller, 1847)
Acrocercops brongniardella (Fabricius, 1798)
Leucospilapteryx omissella (Stainton, 1848)
Phyllonorycter harrisella (Linnaeus, 1761)
Phyllonorycter roboris (Zeller, 1839)
Phyllonorycter heegeriella (Zeller, 1846)
Phyllonorycter tenerella (de Joannis, 1915)
Phyllonorycter kuhlweiniella (Zeller, 1839)
Phyllonorycter quercifoliella (Zeller, 1839)
Phyllonorycter messaniella (Zeller, 1846)
Phyllonorycter platani (Staudinger, 1870)
Phyllonorycter muelleriella (Zeller, 1839)
Phyllonorycter oxyacanthae (Frey, 1856)
Phyllonorycter sorbi (Frey, 1855)
Phyllonorycter mespilella (Hübner, 1805)
Phyllonorycter blancardella Fabricius, 1781
Phyllonorycter hostis Triberti, 2007
Phyllonorycter junoniella (Zeller, 1846)
Phyllonorycter spinicolella (Zeller, 1846)
Phyllonorycter cerasicolella (Herrich-Schäffer, 1855)
Phyllonorycter lantanella (Schrank, 1802)
Phyllonorycter corylifoliella (Hübner, 1796)
Phyllonorycter leucographella (Zeller, 1850) firethorn leaf miner
Phyllonorycter salictella viminiella (Zeller, 1846)
Phyllonorycter viminetorum (Stainton, 1854)
Phyllonorycter salicicolella (Sircom, 1848)
Phyllonorycter dubitella (Herrich-Schäffer, 1855)
Phyllonorycter hilarella (Zetterstedt, 1839)
Phyllonorycter cavella (Zeller, 1846)
Phyllonorycter ulicicolella (Stainton, 1851)
Phyllonorycter scopariella (Zeller, 1846)
Phyllonorycter maestingella (Müller, 1764)
Phyllonorycter coryli (Nicelli, 1851) nut leaf blister moth
Phyllonorycter esperella Goeze, 1783
Phyllonorycter strigulatella (Lienig & Zeller, 1846)
Phyllonorycter rajella (Linnaeus, 1758)
Phyllonorycter distentella (Zeller, 1846)
Phyllonorycter anderidae (W. Fletcher, 1885)
Phyllonorycter quinqueguttella (Stainton, 1851)
Phyllonorycter nigrescentella (Logan, 1851)
Phyllonorycter insignitella (Zeller, 1846)
Phyllonorycter lautella (Zeller, 1846)
Phyllonorycter schreberella Fabricius, 1781
Phyllonorycter ulmifoliella (Hübner, 1817)
Phyllonorycter emberizaepenella (Bouché, 1834)
Phyllonorycter scabiosella (Douglas, 1853)
Phyllonorycter tristrigella (Haworth, 1828)
Phyllonorycter stettinensis (Nicelli, 1852)
Phyllonorycter froelichiella (Zeller, 1839)
Phyllonorycter nicellii (Stainton, 1851)
Phyllonorycter kleemannella (Fabricius, 1781)
Phyllonorycter trifasciella (Haworth, 1828)
Phyllonorycter acerifoliella (Zeller, 1839)
Phyllonorycter platanoidella (de Joannis, 1920)
Phyllonorycter geniculella (Ragonot, 1874)
Phyllonorycter comparella (Duponchel, 1843)
Phyllonorycter sagitella (Bjerkander, 1790)
Cameraria ohridella (Deschka & Dimic, 1986) horse chestnut leaf-miner

Phyllocnistidae
Phyllocnistis saligna (Zeller, 1839)
Phyllocnistis unipunctella (Stephens, 1834)
Phyllocnistis xenia Hering, 1936

Choreutidae
Anthophila fabriciana (Linnaeus, 1767)
Tebenna micalis (Mann, 1857)
Prochoreutis sehestediana (Fabricius, 1776)
Prochoreutis myllerana (Fabricius, 1794)
Choreutis pariana (Clerck, 1759) apple leaf skeletonizer
Choreutis diana (Hübner, 1822)

Glyphipterigidae
Glyphipterix simpliciella (Stephens, 1834) cocksfoot moth
Glyphipterix schoenicolella Boyd, 1858
Glyphipterix equitella (Scopoli, 1763)
Glyphipterix forsterella (Fabricius, 1781)
Glyphipterix haworthana (Stephens, 1834)
Glyphipterix fuscoviridella (Haworth, 1828)
Glyphipterix thrasonella (Scopoli, 1763)

Douglasiidae
Tinagma ocnerostomella (Stainton, 1850)
Tinagma balteolella (Fischer von Röslerstamm, 1840)
Heliodines roesella (Linnaeus, 1758)

Yponomeutidae
Argyresthia laevigatella (Heydenreich, 1851)
Argyresthia illuminatella Zeller
Argyresthia glabratella (Zeller, 1847)
Argyresthia praecocella (Zeller, 1839)
Argyresthia arceuthina (Zeller, 1839)
Argyresthia abdominalis (Zeller, 1839)
Argyresthia dilectella (Zeller, 1847)
Argyresthia aurulentella Stainton, 1849
Argyresthia ivella (Haworth, 1828)
Argyresthia trifasciata Staudinger, 1871
Argyresthia cupressella Walsingham, 1890
Argyresthia brockeella (Hübner, 1813)
Argyresthia goedartella (Linnaeus, 1758)
Argyresthia pygmaeella ([Denis & Schiffermüller], 1775)
Argyresthia sorbiella (Treitschke, 1833)
Argyresthia curvella (Linnaeus, 1761)
Argyresthia retinella Zeller, 1839
Argyresthia glaucinella Zeller, 1839
Argyresthia spinosella Stainton, 1849
Argyresthia conjugella Zeller, 1839 apple fruit moth
Argyresthia semifusca (Haworth, 1828)
Argyresthia pruniella (Clerck, 1759) cherry fruit moth
Argyresthia bonnetella (Linnaeus, 1758)
Argyresthia albistria (Haworth, 1828)
Argyresthia semitestacella (Curtis, 1833)
Yponomeuta evonymella (Linnaeus, 1758) bird-cherry ermine
Yponomeuta padella (Linnaeus, 1758) orchard ermine
Yponomeuta malinellus Zeller, 1838 apple ermine
Yponomeuta cagnagella (Hübner, 1813) spindle ermine
Yponomeuta rorrella (Hübner, 1796) willow ermine
Yponomeuta irrorella (Hübner, 1796)
Yponomeuta plumbella ([Denis & Schiffermüller], 1775)
Yponomeuta sedella Treitschke, 1832
Euhyponomeuta stannella (Thunberg, 1794)
Kessleria fasciapennella (Stainton, 1849)
Kessleria saxifragae (Stainton, 1868)
Zelleria hepariella Stainton, 1849
Pseudoswammerdamia combinella (Hübner, 1786)
Swammerdamia caesiella (Hübner, 1796)
Swammerdamia passerella (Zetterstedt, 1839)
Swammerdamia pyrella (Villers, 1789)
Swammerdamia compunctella (Herrich-Schäffer, 1855)
Paraswammerdamia albicapitella (Scharfenberg, 1805)
Paraswammerdamia nebulella (Goeze, 1783)
Cedestis gysseleniella Zeller, 1839
Cedestis subfasciella (Stephens, 1834)
Ocnerostoma piniariella Zeller, 1847
Ocnerostoma friesei Svensson, 1966
Roeslerstammia pronubella ([Denis & Schiffermüller], 1775)
Roeslerstammia erxlebella (Fabricius, 1787)
Atemelia torquatella (Lienig & Zeller, 1846)
Prays fraxinella (Bjerkander, 1784) ash bud moth
Prays citri (Milliére, 1873)
Prays peregrina Agassiz, 2007
Scythropia crataegella (Linnaeus, 1767) hawthorn moth
Ypsolopha mucronella (Scopoli, 1763)
Ypsolopha nemorella (Linnaeus, 1758)
Ypsolopha dentella (Fabricius, 1775) honeysuckle moth
Ypsolopha asperella (Linnaeus, 1761)
Ypsolopha scabrella (Linnaeus, 1761)
Ypsolopha horridella (Treitschke, 1835)
Ypsolopha lucella (Fabricius, 1775)
Ypsolopha alpella ([Denis & Schiffermüller], 1775)
Ypsolopha sylvella (Linnaeus, 1767)
Ypsolopha parenthesella (Linnaeus, 1761)
Ypsolopha ustella (Clerck, 1759)
Ypsolopha sequella (Clerck, 1759)
Ypsolopha vittella (Linnaeus, 1758)
Plutella xylostella (Linnaeus, 1758) diamond-back moth
Plutella porrectella (Linnaeus, 1758)
Rhigognostis senilella (Zetterstedt, 1839)
Rhigognostis annulatella (Curtis, 1832)
Rhigognostis incarnatella (Steudel, 1873)
Eidophasia messingiella (Fischer von Röslerstamm, 1840)
Orthotelia sparganella (Thunberg, 1788)
Digitivalva perlepidella (Stainton, 1849)
Digitivalva pulicariae Klimesch, 1956
Acrolepiopsis assectella (Zeller, 1839) leek moth
Acrolepiopsis betulella (Curtis, 1838)
Acrolepiopsis marcidella (Curtis, 1850)
Acrolepia autumnitella Curtis, 1838

Epermeniidae
Phaulernis dentella (Zeller, 1839)
Phaulernis fulviguttella (Zeller, 1839)
Epermenia farreni (Walsingham, 1894)
Epermenia profugella (Stainton, 1856)
Epermenia falciformis (Haworth, 1828)
Epermenia insecurella (Stainton, 1849)
Epermenia chaerophyllella (Goeze, 1783)
Epermenia aequidentellus (Hofmann, 1867)

Schreckensteiniidae
Schreckensteinia festaliella (Hübner, 1819)

Coleophoridae
Augasma aeratella (Zeller, 1839)
Metriotes lutarea (Haworth, 1828)
Goniodoma limoniella (Stainton, 1884)
Coleophora albella (Thunberg, 1788)
Coleophora lutipennella (Zeller, 1838)
Coleophora gryphipennella (Hübner, 1796)
Coleophora flavipennella (Duponchel, 1843)
Coleophora serratella (Linnaeus, 1761)
Coleophora coracipennella (Hübner, 1796)
Coleophora prunifoliae Doets, 1944
Coleophora spinella (Schrank, 1802) apple and plum case-bearer
Coleophora milvipennis (Zeller, 1839)
Coleophora badiipennella (Duponchel, 1843)
Coleophora alnifoliae Barasch, 1934
Coleophora limosipennella (Duponchel, 1843)
Coleophora hydrolapathella Hering, 1921
Coleophora siccifolia Stainton, 1856
Coleophora trigeminella Fuchs, 1881
Coleophora fuscocuprella Herrich-Schäffer, 1885
Coleophora lusciniaepennella (Treitschke, 1833)
Coleophora idaeella Hofmann, 1869
Coleophora vitisella Gregson, 1856
Coleophora glitzella Hofmann, 1869
Coleophora arctostaphyli Meder, 1933
Coleophora violacea (Ström, 1783)
Coleophora juncicolella Stainton, 1851
Coleophora orbitella Zeller, 1849
Coleophora binderella (Kollar, 1832)
Coleophora potentillae Elisha, 1885
Coleophora ahenella Heinemann, 1876
Coleophora albitarsella Zeller, 1849
Coleophora trifolii (Curtis, 1832) large clover case-bearer
Coleophora alcyonipennella (Kollar, 1832) clover case-bearer
Coleophora mayrella (Hübner, 1813)
Coleophora deauratella Lienig & Zeller, 1846
Coleophora amethystinella Ragonot, 1885
Coleophora conyzae Zeller, 1868
Coleophora lineolea (Haworth, 1828)
Coleophora hemerobiella (Scopoli, 1763)
Coleophora lithargyrinella Zeller, 1849
Coleophora solitariella Zeller, 1849
Coleophora laricella (Hübner, 1817) larch case-bearer
Coleophora wockeella Zeller, 1849
Coleophora chalcogrammella Zeller, 1849
Coleophora tricolor Walsingham, 1899
Coleophora lixella Zeller, 1849
Coleophora ochrea (Haworth, 1828)
Coleophora albidella ([Denis & Schiffermüller], 1775)
Coleophora anatipennella (Hübner, 1796) pistol case-bearer
Coleophora currucipennella Zeller, 1839
Coleophora ibipennella Zeller, 1849
Coleophora betulella Heinemann, 1876
Coleophora palliatella (Goeze, 1783)
Coleophora vibicella (Hübner, 1813)
Coleophora conspicuella Zeller, 1849
Coleophora vibicigerella Zeller, 1839
Coleophora pyrrhulipennella Zeller, 1839
Coleophora serpylletorum Hering, 1889
Coleophora vulnerariae Zeller, 1839
Coleophora albicosta (Haworth, 1828)
Coleophora saturatella Stainton, 1850
Coleophora genistae Stainton, 1857
Coleophora discordella Zeller, 1849
Coleophora niveicostella Zeller, 1849
Coleophora pennella (Denis & Schiffermüller, 1775)
Coleophora silenella Herrich-Schäffer, 1855
Coleophora galbulipennella Zeller, 1838
Coleophora lassella Staudinger, 1859
Coleophora striatipennella Nylander, 1848
Coleophora inulae Wocke, 1876
Coleophora follicularis (Vallot, 1802)
Coleophora trochilella (Duponchel, 1843)
Coleophora gardesanella Toll, 1953
Coleophora ramosella Zeller, 1849
Coleophora peribenanderi Toll, 1943
Coleophora paripennella Zeller, 1839
Coleophora therinella Tengström, 1848
Coleophora asteris Mühlig, 1864
Coleophora argentula (Stephens, 1834)
Coleophora virgaureae Stainton, 1857
Coleophora saxicolella Duponchel, 1843
Coleophora sternipennella (Zetterstedt, 1839)
Coleophora adspersella Benander, 1939
Coleophora versurella Zeller, 1849
Coleophora squamosella Stainton, 1856
Coleophora pappiferella Hofmann, 1869
Coleophora granulatella Zeller
Coleophora vestianella (Linnaeus, 1758)
Coleophora atriplicis Meyrick, 1928
Coleophora deviella Zeller, 1847
Coleophora salinella Stainton, 1859
Coleophora artemisiella Scott, 1861
Coleophora artemisicolella Bruand, 1855
Coleophora otidipennella (Hübner, 1817)
Coleophora antennariella Herrich-Schäffer, 1861
Coleophora sylvaticella Wood, 1892
Coleophora taeniipennella Herrich-Schäffer, 1855
Coleophora glaucicolella Wood, 1892
Coleophora tamesis Waters, 1929
Coleophora alticolella Zeller, 1849
Coleophora maritimella Newman, 1873
Coleophora adjunctella Hodgkinson, 1882
Coleophora caespititiella Zeller, 1839
Coleophora salicorniae Heinemann & Wocke, 1876
Coleophora clypeiferella Hofmann, 1871

Elachistidae
Perittia obscurepunctella (Stainton, 1848)
Mendesia farinella (Thunberg, 1794)
Stephensia brunnichella (Linnaeus, 1767)
Elachista regificella Sircom, 1849
Elachista gleichenella (Fabricius, 1781)
Elachista biatomella (Stainton, 1848)
Elachista poae Stainton, 1855
Elachista atricomella Stainton, 1849
Elachista kilmunella Stainton, 1849
Elachista alpinella Stainton, 1854
Elachista luticomella Zeller, 1839
Elachista albifrontella (Hübner, 1817)
Elachista apicipunctella Stainton, 1849
Elachista subnigrella Douglas, 1853
Elachista orstadii Palm, 1943
Elachista eskoi Kyrki & Karvonen, 1985
Elachista pomerana Frey, 1870
Elachista occultella Douglas, 1850
Elachista canapennella (Hübner, 1813)
Elachista rufocinerea (Haworth, 1828)
Elachista maculicerusella Bruand, 1859
Elachista argentella (Clerck, 1759)
Elachista triatomea (Haworth, 1828)
Elachista collitella (Duponchel, 1843)
Elachista subocellea (Stephens, 1834)
Elachista triseriatella Stainton, 1854
Elachista cahorsensis Traugott-Olsen, 1992
Elachista bedellella (Sircom, 1848)
Elachista obliquella Stainton, 1854
Elachista cingillella (Herrich-Schäffer, 1855)
Elachista unifasciella (Haworth, 1828)
Elachista gangabella Zeller, 1850
Elachista subalbidella Schläger, 1847
Elachista adscitella Stainton, 1851
Elachista bisulcella (Duponchel, 1843)
Biselachista trapeziella (Stainton, 1849)
Biselachista cinereopunctella (Haworth, 1828)
Biselachista serricornis (Stainton, 1854)
Biselachista scirpi (Stainton, 1887)
Biselachista eleochariella (Stainton, 1851)
Biselachista utonella (Frey, 1856)
Biselachista albidella (Nylander, 1847)
Cosmiotes freyerella (Hübner, 1825)
Cosmiotes consortella (Stainton, 1851)
Cosmiotes stabilella (Stainton, 1858)

Oecophoridae
Schiffermuellerina grandis (Desvignes, 1842)
Denisia subaquilea (Stainton, 1849)
Denisia similella (Hübner, 1796)
Crassa tinctella (Hübner, 1796)
Denisia augustella (Hübner, 1796)
Denisia albimaculea (Haworth, 1828)
Bisigna procerella ([Denis & Schiffermüller], 1775)
Batia lunaris (Haworth, 1828)
Batia lambdella (Donovan, 1793)
Batia unitella (Hübner, 1796)
Metalampra italica Baldizzone, 1977
Epicallima formosella ([Denis & Schiffermüller], 1775)
Borkhausenia fuscescens (Haworth, 1828)
Borkhausenia minutella (Linnaeus, 1758)
Telechrysis tripuncta (Haworth, 1828)
Hofmannophila pseudospretella (Stainton, 1849) brown house-moth
Endrosis sarcitrella (Linnaeus, 1758) white-shouldered house-moth
Esperia sulphurella (Fabricius, 1775)
Esperia oliviella (Fabricius, 1794)
Oecophora bractella (Linnaeus, 1758)
Alabonia geoffrella (Linnaeus, 1767)
Aplota palpella (Haworth, 1828)
Pleurota bicostella (Clerck, 1759)
Pleurota aristella (Linnaeus, 1758)
Tachystola acroxantha (Meyrick, 1885)
Hypercallia citrinalis Scopoli, 1763
Carcina quercana (Fabricius, 1775)
Amphisbatis incongruella (Stainton, 1849)
Pseudatemelia josephinae (Toll, 1956)
Pseudatemelia flavifrontella ([Denis & Schiffermüller], 1775)
Pseudatemelia subochreella (Doubleday, 1859)
Diurnea fagella ([Denis & Schiffermüller], 1775)
Diurnea lipsiella ([Denis & Schiffermüller], 1775)
Dasystoma salicella (Hübner, 1796)
Semioscopis avellanella (Hübner, 1793)
Semioscopis steinkellneriana ([Denis & Schiffermüller], 1775)
Luquetia lobella ([Denis & Schiffermüller], 1775)
Depressaria discipunctella (Herrich-Schäffer, 1854)
Depressaria daucella ([Denis & Schiffermüller], 1775)
Depressaria ultimella Stainton, 1849
Depressaria heraclei (Retzius, 1783) parsnip moth
Depressaria pimpinellae Zeller, 1839
Depressaria badiella (Hübner, 1796)
Depressaria pulcherrimella Stainton, 1849
Depressaria douglasella Stainton, 1849
Depressaria sordidatella Tengström, 1848
Depressaria emeritella Stainton, 1849
Depressaria albipunctella (Denis & Schiffermüller, 1775)
Depressaria olerella Zeller, 1854
Depressaria chaerophylli Zeller, 1839
Depressaria depressana (Fabricius, 1775)
Depressaria silesiaca Heinemann, 1870
Levipalpus hepatariella (Lienig & Zeller, 1846)
Exaeretia ciniflonella (Lienig & Zeller, 1846)
Exaeretia allisella Stainton, 1849
Agonopterix heracliana (Linnaeus, 1758)
Agonopterix ciliella (Stainton, 1849)
Agonopterix cnicella (Treitschke, 1832)
Agonopterix purpurea (Haworth, 1811)
Agonopterix subpropinquella (Stainton, 1849)
Agonopterix putridella ([Denis & Schiffermüller], 1775)
Agonopterix nanatella (Stainton, 1849)
Agonopterix alstromeriana (Clerck, 1759)
Agonopterix propinquella (Treitschke, 1835)
Agonopterix arenella ([Denis & Schiffermüller], 1775)
Agonopterix kaekeritziana (Linnaeus, 1767)
Agonopterix bipunctosa (Curtis, 1850)
Agonopterix pallorella (Zeller, 1839)
Agonopterix ocellana (Fabricius, 1775)
Agonopterix assimilella (Treitschke, 1832)
Agonopterix atomella ([Denis & Schiffermüller], 1775)
Agonopterix scopariella (Heinemann, 1870)
Agonopterix umbellana (Fabricius, 1794)
Agonopterix nervosa (Haworth, 1811)
Agonopterix carduella (Hübner, 1817)
Agonopterix liturosa Bradley, 1966
Agonopterix conterminella (Zeller, 1839)
Agonopterix curvipunctosa (Haworth, 1811)
Agonopterix astrantiae (Heinemann, 1870)
Agonopterix angelicella (Hübner, 1813)
Agonopterix yeatiana (Fabricius, 1781)
Agonopterix capreolella (Zeller, 1839)
Agonopterix rotundella (Douglas, 1846)

Ethmiidae
Ethmia terminella T. B. Fletcher, 1938
Ethmia dodecea (Haworth, 1828)
Ethmia quadrillella (Goeze, 1783)
Ethmia bipunctella (Fabricius, 1775)
Ethmia pusiella (Linnaeus, 1758)
Ethmia pyrausta (Pallas, 1771)

Gelechiidae
Metzneria littorella (Douglas, 1850)
Metzneria lappella (Linnaeus, 1758)
Metzneria aestivella (Zeller, 1839)
Metzneria metzneriella (Stainton, 1851)
Metzneria neuropterella (Zeller, 1839)
Metzneria aprilella (Herrich-Schäffer, 1854)
Monochroa cytisella (Curtis, 1837)
Isophrictis striatella ([Denis & Schiffermüller], 1775)
Apodia bifractella (Duponchel, 1843)
Eulamprotes atrella ([Denis & Schiffermüller], 1775)
Eulamprotes immaculatella (Douglas, 1850)
Eulamprotes unicolorella (Duponchel, 1843)
Eulamprotes wilkella (Linnaeus, 1758)
Argolamprotes micella ([Denis & Schiffermüller], 1775)
Monochroa tenebrella (Hübner, 1817)
Monochroa lucidella (Stephens, 1834)
Monochroa palustrella (Douglas, 1850)
Monochroa tetragonella (Stainton, 1885)
Monochroa conspersella (Herrich-Schäffer, 1854)
Monochroa hornigi (Staudinger, 1883)
Monochroa suffusella (Douglas, 1850)
Monochroa lutulentella (Zeller, 1839)
Monochroa elongella (Heinemann, 1870)
Monochroa arundinetella (Stainton, 1858)
Monochroa divisella (Douglas, 1850)
Monochroa niphognatha (Gozmány, 1953)
Chrysoesthia drurella (Fabricius, 1775)
Chrysoesthia sexguttella (Thunberg, 1794)
Ptocheuusa paupella (Zeller, 1847)
Sitotroga cerealella (Olivier, 1789) Angoumois grain moth
Psamathocrita osseella (Stainton, 1861)
Aristotelia subdecurtella (Stainton, 1859)
Aristotelia ericinella (Zeller, 1839)
Aristotelia brizella (Treitschke, 1833)
Xystophora pulveratella (Herrich-Schäffer, 1854)
Stenolechia gemmella (Linnaeus, 1758)
Parachronistis albiceps (Zeller, 1839)
Recurvaria nanella ([Denis & Schiffermüller], 1775)
Recurvaria leucatella (Clerck, 1759)
Coleotechnites piceaella (Kearfott, 1903)
Exoteleia dodecella (Linnaeus, 1758)
Athrips tetrapunctella (Thunberg, 1794)
Athrips mouffetella (Linnaeus, 1758)
Xenolechia aethiops (Humphreys & Westwood, 1845)
Pseudotelphusa scalella (Scopoli, 1763)
Teleiodes vulgella ([Denis & Schiffermüller], 1775)
Altenia scriptella (Hübner, 1796)
Carpatolechia decorella (Haworth, 1812)
Carpatolechia notatella (Hübner, 1813)
Teleiodes wagae (Nowicki, 1860)
Carpatolechia proximella (Hübner, 1796)
Carpatolechia alburnella (Zeller, 1839)
Carpatolechia fugitivella (Zeller, 1839)
Pseudotelphusa paripunctella (Thunberg, 1794)
Teleiodes luculella (Hübner, 1813)
Teleiodes sequax (Haworth, 1828)
Teleiopsis diffinis (Haworth, 1828)
Bryotropha basaltinella (Zeller, 1839)
Bryotropha dryadella (Zeller, 1850)
Bryotropha umbrosella (Zeller, 1839)
Bryotropha affinis (Haworth, 1828)
Bryotropha similis (Stainton, 1854)
Bryotropha mundella (Douglas, 1850)
Bryotropha senectella (Zeller, 1839)
Bryotropha boreella (Douglas, 1851)
Bryotropha galbanella (Zeller, 1839)
Bryotropha figulella (Staudinger, 1859)
Bryotropha desertella (Douglas, 1850)
Bryotropha terrella ([Denis & Schiffermüller], 1775)
Bryotropha politella (Stainton, 1851)
Bryotropha domestica (Haworth, 1828)
Chionodes fumatella (Douglas, 1850)
Chionodes distinctella (Zeller, 1839)
Mirificarma mulinella (Zeller, 1839)
Mirificarma lentiginosella (Zeller, 1839)
Prolita sexpunctella (Fabricius, 1794)
Prolita solutella (Zeller, 1839)
Gelechia muscosella Zeller, 1839
Gelechia cuneatella Douglas, 1852
Gelechia hippophaella (Schrank, 1802)
Gelechia nigra (Haworth, 1828)
Gelechia turpella ([Denis & Schiffermüller], 1775)
Aroga velocella (Zeller, 1839)
Neofaculta ericetella (Geyer, 1832)
Neofriseria peliella (Treitschke, 1835)
Neofriseria singula (Staudinger, 1876)
Gelechia rhombella ([Denis & Schiffermüller], 1775)
Gelechia scotinella Herrich-Schäffer, 1854
Gelechia senticetella (Staudinger, 1859)
Gelechia sabinellus (Zeller, 1839)
Gelechia sororculella (Hübner, 1817)
Platyedra subcinerea (Haworth, 1828)
Pexicopia malvella (Hübner, 1805) hollyhock seed moth
Scrobipalpa suaedella (Richardson, 1893)
Scrobipalpa samadensis (Stainton, 1883)
Scrobipalpa instabilella (Douglas, 1846)
Scrobipalpa salinella (Zeller, 1847)
Scrobipalpa ocellatella (Boyd, 1858) beet moth
Scrobipalpa nitentella (Fuchs, 1902)
Scrobipalpa obsoletella (Fischer von Röslerstamm, 1841)
Scrobipalpa clintoni Povolny, 1968
Scrobipalpa atriplicella (Fischer von Röslerstamm, 1841)
Scrobipalpa costella (Humphreys & Westwood, 1845)
Scrobipalpa artemisiella (Treitschke, 1833) thyme moth
Scrobipalpa murinella (Duponchel, 1843)
Scrobipalpa acuminatella (Sircom, 1850)
Scrobipalpula diffluella (Frey, 1870)
Scrobipalpula tussilaginis (Stainton, 1867)
Gnorimoschema streliciella (Herrich-Schäffer, 1854)
Phthorimaea operculella (Zeller, 1873) potato tuber moth
Caryocolum vicinella (Douglas, 1851)
Caryocolum alsinella (Zeller, 1868)
Caryocolum viscariella (Stainton, 1855)
Caryocolum marmoreum (Haworth, 1828)
Caryocolum fraternella (Douglas, 1851)
Caryocolum proximum (Haworth, 1828)
Caryocolum blandella (Douglas, 1852)
Caryocolum junctella (Douglas, 1851)
Caryocolum tricolorella (Haworth, 1812)
Caryocolum blandulella (Tutt, 1887)
Caryocolum kroesmanniella (Herrich-Schäffer, 1854)
Caryocolum huebneri (Haworth, 1827)
Nothris verbascella (Hübner, 1813)
Nothris congressariella (Bruand, 1858)
Thiotricha subocellea (Stephens, 1834)
Sophronia semicostella (Hübner, 1813)
Sophronia humerella ([Denis & Schiffermüller], 1775)
Aproaerema anthyllidella (Hübner, 1813)
Syncopacma larseniella (Gozmany, 1957)
Syncopacma sangiella (Stainton, 1863)
Syncopacma vinella (Bankes, 1898)
Syncopacma taeniolella (Zeller, 1839)
Syncopacma albipalpella (Herrich-Schäffer, 1854)
Syncopacma cinctella (Clerck, 1759)
Syncopacma polychromella (Rebel, 1902)
Dichomeris alacella (Zeller, 1839)
Anacampsis temerella (Lienig & Zeller, 1846)
Anacampsis populella (Clerck, 1759)
Anacampsis blattariella (Hübner, 1796)
Acompsia cinerella (Clerck, 1759)
Anarsia spartiella (Schrank, 1802)
Anarsia lineatella Zeller, 1839 peach twig borer
Hypatima rhomboidella (Linnaeus, 1758)
Psoricoptera gibbosella (Zeller, 1839)
Mesophleps silacella (Hübner, 1796)
Acompsia schmidtiellus (Heyden, 1848)
Dichomeris marginella (Fabricius, 1781) juniper webber
Dichomeris juniperella (Linnaeus, 1761)
Dichomeris ustalella (Fabricius, 1794)
Dichomeris derasella ([Denis & Schiffermüller], 1775)
Brachmia blandella (Fabricius, 1798)
Brachmia inornatella (Douglas, 1850)
Helcystogramma rufescens (Haworth, 1828)
Helcystogramma lutatella (Herrich-Schäffer, 1854)
Oegoconia quadripuncta (Haworth, 1828)
Oegoconia deauratella (Herrich-Schäffer, 1854)
Oegoconia caradjai Popescu-Gorg & Capuse, 1965
Symmoca signatella Herrich-Schäffer, 1854

Blastobasidae
Blastobasis adustella Walsingham, 1894
Blastobasis lacticolella (Wollaston, 1858)
Blastobasis phycidella (Zeller, 1839)
Blastobasis rebeli Karsholt & Sinev, 2004
Auximobasis normalis Meyrick, 1918

Oecophoridae
Stathmopoda pedella (Linnaeus, 1761)

Momphidae
Batrachedra praeangusta (Haworth, 1828)
Batrachedra pinicolella (Zeller, 1839)
Mompha langiella (Hübner, 1796)
Mompha terminella (Humphreys & Westwood, 1845)
Mompha locupletella ([Denis & Schiffermüller], 1775)
Mompha raschkiella (Zeller, 1839)
Mompha miscella ([Denis & Schiffermüller], 1775)
Mompha conturbatella (Hübner, 1819)
Mompha ochraceella (Curtis, 1839)
Mompha lacteella (Stephens, 1834)
Mompha propinquella (Stainton, 1851)
Mompha divisella Herrich-Schäffer, 1854
Mompha bradleyi Riedl, 1965
Mompha jurassicella (Frey,1881)
Mompha sturnipennella (Treitschke, 1833)
Mompha subbistrigella (Haworth, 1828)
Mompha epilobiella ([Denis & Schiffermüller], 1775)

Cosmopterigidae
Cosmopterix zieglerella (Hübner, 1810)
Cosmopterix schmidiella Frey, 1856
Cosmopterix orichalcea Stainton, 1861
Cosmopterix scribaiella Zeller, 1850
Cosmopterix pulchrimella Chambers, 1875
Cosmopterix lienigiella Lienig & Zeller, 1846
Anatrachyntis badia (Hodges, 1962)
Limnaecia phragmitella Stainton, 1851
Pyroderces argyrogrammos (Zeller, 1847)
Pancalia leuwenhoekella (Linnaeus, 1761)
Pancalia schwarzella (Fabricius, 1798)
Euclemensia woodiella (Curtis, 1830)
Chrysoclista lathamella T. B. Fletcher, 1936
Chrysoclista linneella (Clerck, 1759)
Spuleria flavicaput (Haworth, 1828)
Blastodacna hellerella (Duponchel, 1838)
Blastodacna atra (Haworth, 1828) apple pith moth
Dystebenna stephensi (Stainton, 1849)
Sorhagenia rhamniella (Zeller, 1839)
Sorhagenia lophyrella (Douglas, 1846)
Sorhagenia janiszewskae Riedl, 1962

Scythrididae
Scythris grandipennis (Haworth, 1828)
Scythris fuscoaenea (Haworth, 1828)
Scythris fallacella (Schläger, 1847)
Scythris crassiuscula (Herrich-Schäffer, 1855)
Scythris picaepennis (Haworth, 1828)
Scythris siccella (Zeller, 1839)
Scythris empetrella Karsholt & Nielsen, 1976
Scythris limbella (Fabricius, 1775)
Scythris cicadella (Zeller, 1839)
Scythris potentillella (Zeller, 1847)
Scythris inspersella (Hübner, 1817)

Tortricidae
Phtheochroa inopiana (Haworth, 1811)
Phtheochroa schreibersiana (Frölich, 1828)
Phtheochroa sodaliana (Haworth, 1811)
Hysterophora maculosana (Haworth, 1811)
Phtheochroa rugosana (Hübner, 1799)
Phalonidia manniana (Fischer von Röslerstamm, 1839)
Gynnidomorpha minimana (Caradja, 1916)
Gynnidomorpha permixtana ([Denis & Schiffermüller], 1775)
Gynnidomorpha vectisana (Humphreys & Westwood, 1845)
Gynnidomorpha alismana (Ragonot, 1883)
Gynnidomorpha luridana (Gregson, 1870)
Phalonidia affinitana (Douglas, 1846)
Phalonidia gilvicomana (Zeller, 1847)
Phalonidia curvistrigana (Stainton, 1859)
Cochylimorpha alternana (Stephens, 1834)
Cochylimorpha straminea (Haworth, 1811)
Agapeta hamana (Linnaeus, 1758)
Agapeta zoegana (Linnaeus, 1767)
Aethes tesserana ([Denis & Schiffermüller], 1775)
Aethes rutilana (Hübner, 1817)
Aethes hartmanniana (Clerck, 1759)
Aethes piercei Obraztsov, 1952
Aethes margarotana (Duponchel, 1836)
Aethes williana (Brahm, 1791)
Aethes cnicana (Westwood, 1854)
Aethes rubigana (Treitschke, 1830)
Aethes smeathmanniana (Fabricius, 1781)
Aethes margaritana (Haworth, 1811)
Aethes dilucidana (Stephens, 1852)
Aethes francillana (Fabricius, 1794)
Aethes beatricella (Walsingham, 1898)
Commophila aeneana (Hübner, 1800)
Eugnosta lathoniana (Hübner, 1800)
Eupoecilia angustana (Hübner, 1799)
Eupoecilia ambiguella (Hübner, 1796) vine moth
Cochylidia implicitana (Wocke, 1856)
Cochylidia heydeniana (Herrich-Schäffer, 1851)
Cochylidia subroseana (Haworth, 1811)
Cochylidia rupicola (Curtis, 1834)
Falseuncaria ruficiliana (Haworth, 1811)
Falseuncaria degreyana (McLachlen, 1859)
Cochylis roseana (Haworth, 1811)
Cochylis flaviciliana (Westwood, 1854)
Cochylis dubitana (Hübner, 1799)
Cochylis molliculana Zeller, 1874
Cochylis hybridella (Hübner, 1813)
Cochylis atricapitana (Stephens, 1852)
Cochylis pallidana Zeller, 1847
Cochylis nana (Haworth, 1811)
Pandemis corylana (Fabricius, 1794) chequered fruit-tree tortrix
Pandemis cerasana (Hübner, 1786) barred fruit-tree tortrix
Pandemis cinnamomeana (Treitschke, 1830)
Pandemis heparana ([Denis & Schiffermüller], 1775) dark fruit-tree tortrix
Pandemis dumetana (Treitschke, 1835)
Argyrotaenia ljungiana (Thunberg, 1797)
Homona menciana (Walker, 1863) camellia tortrix
Archips oporana (Linnaeus, 1758)
Archips podana (Scopoli, 1763) large fruit-tree tortrix
Archips betulana (Hübner, 1787)
Archips crataegana (Hübner, 1799) brown oak tortrix
Archips xylosteana (Linnaeus, 1758) variegated golden tortrix
Archips rosana (Linnaeus, 1758) rose tortrix
Choristoneura diversana (Hübner, 1817)
Choristoneura hebenstreitella (Müller, 1764)
Choristoneura lafauryana (Ragonot, 1875)
Cacoecimorpha pronubana (Hübner, 1799) carnation tortrix
Syndemis musculana (Hübner, 1799)
Ptycholomoides aeriferanus (Herrich-Schäffer, 1851)
Aphelia viburnana ([Denis & Schiffermüller], 1775) bilberry tortrix
Aphelia paleana (Hübner, 1793) timothy tortrix
Aphelia unitana (Hübner, 1799)
Clepsis senecionana (Hübner, 1819)
Clepsis rurinana (Linnaeus, 1758)
Clepsis spectrana (Treitschke, 1830) cyclamen tortrix
Clepsis consimilana (Hübner, 1817)
Clepsis trileucana (Doubleday, 1847)
Clepsis melaleucanus (Walker, 1863)
Epichoristodes acerbella (Walker, 1864) African carnation tortrix
Epiphyas postvittana (Walker, 1863) light brown apple moth
Adoxophyes orana (Fischer von Röslerstamm, 1834) summer fruit tortrix
Adoxophyes privatana (Walker, 1863)
Ptycholoma lecheana (Linnaeus, 1758)
Lozotaeniodes formosanus (Geyer, 1830)
Lozotaenia forsterana (Fabricius, 1781)
Lozotaenia subocellana (Stephens, 1834)
Paramesia gnomana (Clerck, 1759)
Periclepsis cinctana ([Denis & Schiffermüller], 1775)
Epagoge grotiana (Fabricius, 1781)
Capua vulgana (Frölich, 1828)
Philedone gerningana ([Denis & Schiffermüller], 1775)
Philedonides lunana (Thunberg, 1784)
Ditula angustiorana (Haworth, 1811) red-barred tortrix
Pseudargyrotoza conwagana (Fabricius, 1775)
Sparganothis pilleriana ([Denis & Schiffermüller], 1775)
Olindia schumacherana (Fabricius, 1787)
Isotrias rectifasciana (Haworth, 1811)
Eulia ministrana (Linnaeus, 1758)
Cnephasia longana (Haworth, 1811)
Cnephasia gueneana (Duponchel, 1836)
Cnephasia communana (Herrich-Schäffer, 1851)
Cnephasia conspersana Douglas, 1846
Cnephasia stephensiana (Doubleday, 1849) grey tortrix
Cnephasia asseclana ([Denis & Schiffermüller], 1775) flax tortrix
Cnephasia pasiuana (Hübner, 1799)
Cnephasia genitalana Pierce & Metcalfe, 1915
Cnephasia incertana (Treitschke, 1835) light grey tortrix
Tortricodes alternella ([Denis & Schiffermüller], 1775)
Exapate congelatella (Clerck, 1759)
Neosphaleroptera nubilana (Hübner, 1799)
Eana argentana (Clerck, 1759)
Eana osseana (Scopoli, 1763)
Eana incanana (Stephens, 1852)
Eana penziana (Thunberg, 1791)
Aleimma loeflingiana (Linnaeus, 1758)
Tortrix viridana Linnaeus, 1758 green oak tortrix
Spatalistis bifasciana (Hübner, 1787)
Acleris bergmanniana (Linnaeus, 1758)
Acleris forsskaleana (Linnaeus, 1758)
Acleris holmiana (Linnaeus, 1758)
Acleris laterana (Fabricius, 1794)
Acleris comariana (Lienig & Zeller, 1846) strawberry tortrix
Acleris caledoniana (Stephens, 1852)
Acleris sparsana ([Denis & Schiffermüller], 1775)
Acleris rhombana ([Denis & Schiffermüller], 1775) rhomboid tortrix
Acleris aspersana (Hübner, 1817)
Acleris ferrugana ([Denis & Schiffermüller], 1775)
Acleris notana (Donovan, 1806)
Acleris shepherdana (Stephens, 1852)
Acleris schalleriana (Linnaeus, 1761)
Acleris variegana ([Denis & Schiffermüller], 1775) garden rose tortrix
Acleris permutana (Duponchel, 1836)
Acleris kochiella (Goeze, 1783)
Acleris logiana (Clerck, 1759)
Acleris umbrana (Hübner, 1799)
Acleris hastiana (Linnaeus, 1758)
Acleris cristana ([Denis & Schiffermüller], 1775)
Acleris hyemana (Haworth, 1811)
Acleris lipsiana ([Denis & Schiffermüller], 1775)
Acleris rufana ([Denis & Schiffermüller], 1775)
Acleris lorquiniana (Duponchel, 1835)
Acleris abietana (Hübner, 1822)
Acleris maccana (Treitschke, 1835)
Acleris literana (Linnaeus, 1758)
Acleris emargana (Fabricius, 1775)
Celypha striana ([Denis & Schiffermüller], 1775)
Celypha rosaceana (Schläger, 1847)
Celypha rufana (Scopoli, 1763)
Celypha woodiana (Barrett, 1882)
Celypha cespitana (Hübner, 1817)
Celypha rivulana (Scopoli, 1763)
Celypha aurofasciana (Haworth, 1811)
Olethreutes mygindiana ([Denis & Schiffermüller], 1775)
Olethreutes arbutella (Linnaeus, 1758)
Olethreutes metallicana (Hübner, 1799)
Olethreutes schulziana (Fabricius, 1777)
Olethreutes palustrana (Lienig & Zeller, 1846)
Phiaris micana ([Denis & Schiffermüller], 1775)
Celypha lacunana ([Denis & Schiffermüller], 1775)
Olethreutes obsoletana (Zetterstedt, 1840)
Celypha doubledayana (Barrett, 1872)
Piniphila bifasciana (Haworth, 1811)
Olethreutes arcuella (Clerck, 1759)
Pristerognatha penthinana (Guenée, 1845)
Hedya pruniana (Hübner, 1799) plum tortrix
Hedya nubiferana (Haworth, 1811) marbled orchard tortrix
Hedya ochroleucana (Frölich, 1828)
Metendothenia atropunctana (Zetterstedt, 1839)
Hedya salicella (Linnaeus, 1758)
Orthotaenia undulana ([Denis & Schiffermüller], 1775)
Pseudosciaphila branderiana (Linnaeus, 1758)
Apotomis semifasciana (Haworth, 1811)
Apotomis infida (Heinrich, 1926)
Apotomis lineana ([Denis & Schiffermüller], 1775)
Apotomis turbidana (Hübner, 1825)
Apotomis betuletana (Haworth, 1811)
Apotomis capreana (Hübner, 1817)
Apotomis sororculana (Zetterstedt, 1839)
Apotomis sauciana (Frölich, 1828)
Endothenia gentianaeana (Hübner, 1799)
Endothenia oblongana (Haworth, 1811)
Endothenia marginana (Haworth, 1811)
Endothenia pullana (Haworth, 1811)
Endothenia ustulana (Haworth, 1811)
Endothenia nigricostana (Haworth, 1811)
Endothenia ericetana (Humphreys & Westwood, 1845)
Endothenia quadrimaculana (Haworth, 1811)
Lobesia occidentis Falkovitsh, 1970
Lobesia reliquana (Hübner, 1825)
Lobesia botrana ([Denis & Schiffermüller], 1775) European vine moth
Lobesia abscisana (Doubleday, 1849)
Lobesia littoralis (Humphreys & Westwood, 1845)
Bactra furfurana (Haworth, 1811)
Bactra lancealana (Hübner, 1799)
Bactra lacteana (Caradja, 1916)
Bactra robustana (Christoph, 1872)
Eudemis profundana ([Denis & Schiffermüller], 1775)
Eudemis porphyrana (Hübner, 1799)
Ancylis achatana ([Denis & Schiffermüller], 1775)
Ancylis comptana (Frölich, 1828)
Ancylis unguicella (Linnaeus, 1758)
Ancylis uncella ([Denis & Schiffermüller], 1775)
Ancylis geminana (Donovan, 1806)
Ancylis diminutana (Haworth, 1811)
Ancylis mitterbacheriana ([Denis & Schiffermüller], 1775)
Ancylis upupana (Treitschke, 1835)
Ancylis obtusana (Haworth, 1811)
Ancylis laetana (Fabricius, 1775)
Ancylis tineana (Hübner, 1799)
Ancylis unculana (Haworth, 1811)
Ancylis badiana ([Denis & Schiffermüller], 1775)
Ancylis paludana (Barrett, 1871)
Ancylis myrtillana (Treitschke, 1830)
Ancylis apicella ([Denis & Schiffermüller], 1775)
Epinotia pygmaeana (Hübner, 1799)
Epinotia subsequana (Haworth, 1811)
Epinotia subocellana (Donovan, 1806)
Epinotia bilunana (Haworth, 1811)
Epinotia ramella (Linnaeus, 1758)
Epinotia demarniana (Fischer von Röslerstamm, 1840)
Epinotia immundana (Fischer von Röslerstamm, 1839)
Epinotia tetraquetrana (Haworth, 1811)
Epinotia nisella (Clerck, 1759)
Epinotia tenerana ([Denis & Schiffermüller], 1775) nut bud moth
Epinotia nigricana (Herrich-Schäffer, 1851)
Epinotia nemorivaga (Tengström, 1848)
Epinotia tedella (Clerck, 1759)
Epinotia fraternana (Haworth, 1811)
Epinotia signatana (Douglas, 1845)
Epinotia nanana (Treitschke, 1835)
Epinotia rubiginosana (Herrich-Schäffer, 1851)
Epinotia cruciana (Linnaeus, 1761) willow tortrix
Epinotia mercuriana (Frölich, 1828)
Epinotia crenana (Hübner, 1817)
Epinotia abbreviana (Fabricius, 1794)
Epinotia trigonella (Linnaeus, 1758)
Epinotia maculana (Fabricius, 1775)
Epinotia sordidana (Hübner, 1824)
Epinotia caprana (Fabricius, 1798)
Epinotia brunnichana (Linnaeus, 1767)
Epinotia solandriana (Linnaeus, 1758)
Crocidosema plebejana (Zeller, 1847)
Rhopobota ustomaculana (Curtis, 1831)
Rhopobota naevana (Hübner, 1817) holly tortrix
Acroclita subsequana (Herrich-Schäffer, 1851)
Rhopobota stagnana ([Denis & Schiffermüller], 1775)
Rhopobota myrtillana (Humphreys & Westwood, 1845)
Zeiraphera ratzeburgiana (Ratzeburgh, 1840)
Zeiraphera rufimitrana (Herrich-Schäffer, 1851)
Zeiraphera isertana (Fabricius, 1794)
Zeiraphera griseana (Hübner, 1799) larch tortrix
Gypsonoma aceriana (Duponchel, 1843)
Gypsonoma sociana (Haworth, 1811)
Gypsonoma dealbana (Frölich, 1828)
Gypsonoma oppressana (Treitschke, 1835)
Gypsonoma minutana (Hübner, 1799)
Gypsonoma nitidulana (Lienig & Zeller, 1846)
Gibberifera simplana (Fischer von Röslerstamm, 1836)
Epiblema cynosbatella (Linnaeus, 1758)
Epiblema uddmanniana (Linnaeus, 1758) bramble shoot moth
Epiblema trimaculana (Haworth, 1811)
Epiblema rosaecolana (Doubleday, 1850)
Epiblema roborana ([Denis & Schiffermüller], 1775)
Epiblema incarnatana (Hübner, 1800)
Epiblema tetragonana (Stephens, 1834)
Epiblema grandaevana (Lienig & Zeller, 1846)
Epiblema turbidana (Treitschke, 1835)
Epiblema foenella (Linnaeus, 1758)
Epiblema scutulana ([Denis & Schiffermüller], 1775)
Epiblema cirsiana (Zeller, 1843)
Epiblema cnicicolana (Zeller, 1847)
Epiblema sticticana (Fabricius, 1794)
Epiblema costipunctana (Haworth, 1811)
Pelochrista caecimaculana (Hübner, 1799)
Eriopsela quadrana (Hübner, 1813)
Eucosma aspidiscana (Hübner, 1817)
Eucosma rubescana (Constant, 1895)
Eucosma conterminana (Guenée, 1845)
Eucosma tripoliana (Barrett, 1880)
Eucosma aemulana (Schläger, 1849)
Eucosma lacteana (Treitschke, 1835)
Eucosma metzneriana (Treitschke, 1830)
Eucosma campoliliana ([Denis & Schiffermüller], 1775)
Eucosma pauperana (Duponchel, 1843)
Eucosma pupillana (Clerck, 1759)
Eucosma hohenwartiana ([Denis & Schiffermüller], 1775)
Eucosma cana (Haworth, 1811)
Eucosma obumbratana (Lienig & Zeller, 1846)
Thiodia torridana Lederer, 1859
Thiodia citrana (Hübner, 1799)
Spilonota ocellana ([Denis & Schiffermüller], 1775) bud moth
Spilonota laricana (Heinemann, 1863)
Clavigesta sylvestrana (Curtis, 1850)
Clavigesta purdeyi (Durrant, 1911) pine leaf-mining moth
Pseudococcyx posticana (Zetterstedt, 1839)
Pseudococcyx turionella (Linnaeus, 1758) pine bud moth
Rhyacionia buoliana ([Denis & Schiffermüller], 1775) pine shoot moth
Rhyacionia pinicolana (Doubleday, 1849)
Rhyacionia pinivorana (Lienig & Zeller, 1846) spotted shoot moth
Rhyacionia logaea Durrant, 1911 Elgin shoot moth
Retinia resinella (Linnaeus, 1758) pine resin-gall moth
Thaumatotibia leucotreta (Meyrick, 1913) false codling moth
Enarmonia formosana (Scopoli, 1763) cherry-bark moth
Eucosmomorpha albersana (Hübner, 1813)
Selania leplastriana (Curtis, 1831)
Lathronympha strigana (Fabricius, 1775)
Cydia microgrammana (Guenée, 1845)
Strophedra weirana (Douglas, 1850)
Strophedra nitidana (Fabricius, 1794)
Pammene splendidulana (Guenée, 1845)
Pammene luedersiana (Sorhagen, 1885)
Pammene obscurana (Stephens, 1834)
Pammene agnotana Rebel, 1914
Pammene giganteana (Peyerimhoff, 1863)
Pammene argyrana (Hübner, 1799)
Pammene ignorata Kuznetsov, 1968
Pammene albuginana (Guenée, 1845)
Pammene suspectana (Lienig & Zeller, 1846)
Pammene spiniana (Duponchel, 1843)
Pammene populana (Fabricius, 1787)
Pammene aurita Razowski, 1991
Pammene regiana (Zeller, 1849)
Pammene trauniana ([Denis & Schiffermüller], 1775)
Pammene fasciana (Linnaeus, 1761)
Pammene germmana (Hübner, 1799)
Pammene ochsenheimeriana (Lienig & Zeller, 1846)
Pammene rhediella (Clerck, 1759) fruitlet mining tortrix
Grapholita caecana (Schläger, 1847)
Grapholita compositella (Fabricius, 1775)
Grapholita internana (Guenée, 1845)
Grapholita pallifrontana (Lienig & Zeller, 1846)
Grapholita gemmiferana (Treitschke, 1835)
Grapholita janthinana (Duponchel, 1835)
Grapholita tenebrosana (Duponchel, 1843)
Grapholita funebrana (Treitschke, 1835) plum fruit moth
Grapholita molesta (Busck, 1916) Oriental fruit moth
Grapholita lobarzewskii (Nowicki, 1860)
Grapholita lathyrana (Hübner, 1813)
Grapholita jungiella (Clerck, 1759)
Grapholita lunulana ([Denis & Schiffermüller], 1775)
Grapholita orobana (Treitschke, 1830)
Cydia strobilella (Linnaeus, 1758)
Cydia ulicetana (Haworth, 1811)
Cydia servillana (Duponchel, 1836)
Cydia nigricana (Fabricius, 1794) pea moth
Cydia millenniana (Adamczewski, 1967)
Cydia fagiglandana (Zeller, 1841)
Cydia splendana (Hübner, 1799)
Cydia pomonella (Linnaeus, 1758) codling moth
Cydia amplana (Hübner, 1799)
Cydia inquinatana (Hübner, 1799)
Cydia leguminana (Lienig & Zeller, 1846)
Cydia cognatana (Barrett, 1874)
Cydia pactolana (Zeller, 1840)
Cydia cosmophorana (Treitschke, 1835)
Cydia coniferana (Ratzeburgh, 1840)
Cydia conicolana (Heylaerts, 1874)
Cydia corollana (Hübner, 1823)
Pammene gallicana (Guenée, 1845)
Pammene aurana (Fabricius, 1775)
Dichrorampha petiverella (Linnaeus, 1758)
Dichrorampha alpinana (Treitschke, 1830)
Dichrorampha flavidorsana Knaggs, 1867
Dichrorampha plumbagana (Treitschke, 1830)
Dichrorampha senectana Guenée, 1845
Dichrorampha sequana (Hübner, 1799)
Dichrorampha acuminatana (Lienig & Zeller, 1846)
Dichrorampha consortana Stephens, 1852
Dichrorampha simpliciana (Haworth, 1811)
Dichrorampha sylvicolana Heinemann, 1863
Dichrorampha montanana (Duponchel, 1843)
Dichrorampha vancouverana McDunnough, 1935
Dichrorampha plumbana (Scopoli, 1763)
Dichrorampha sedatana Busck, 1906
Dichrorampha aeratana (Pierce & Metcalfe, 1915)

Alucitidae
Alucita hexadactyla Linnaeus, 1758 twenty-plume moth

Crambidae
Euchromius ocellea (Haworth, 1811)
Chilo phragmitella (Hübner, 1805)
Haimbachia cicatricella (Hübner, 1824)
Calamotropha paludella (Hübner, 1824)
Chrysoteuchia culmella (Linnaeus, 1758)
Crambus pascuella (Linnaeus, 1758)
Crambus leucoschalis Hampson, 1898
Crambus silvella (Hübner, 1813)
Crambus uliginosellus Zeller, 1850
Crambus ericella (Hübner, 1813)
Crambus hamella (Thunberg, 1788)
Crambus pratella (Linnaeus, 1758)
Crambus lathoniellus (Zincken, 1817)
Crambus perlella (Scopoli, 1763)
Agriphila selasella (Hübner, 1813)
Agriphila straminella ([Denis & Schiffermüller], 1775)
Agriphila tristella ([Denis & Schiffermüller], 1775)
Agriphila inquinatella ([Denis & Schiffermüller], 1775)
Agriphila latistria (Haworth, 1811)
Agriphila geniculea (Haworth, 1811)
Catoptria permutatella (Herrich-Schäffer, 1848)
Catoptria osthelderi (de Lattin, 1950)
Catoptria speculalis Hübner, 1825
Catoptria pinella (Linnaeus, 1758)
Catoptria margaritella ([Denis & Schiffermüller], 1775)
Catoptria furcatellus (Zetterstedt, 1840)
Catoptria falsella ([Denis & Schiffermüller], 1775)
Catoptria verellus (Zincken, 1817)
Catoptria lythargyrella (Hübner, 1796)
Chrysocrambus linetella (Fabricius, 1781)
Chrysocrambus craterella (Scopoli, 1763)
Thisanotia chrysonuchella (Scopoli, 1763)
Pediasia fascelinella (Hübner, 1813)
Pediasia contaminella (Hübner, 1796)
Pediasia aridella (Thunberg, 1788)
Platytes alpinella (Hübner, 1813)
Platytes cerussella ([Denis & Schiffermüller], 1775)
Ancylolomia tentaculella (Hübner, 1796)
Schoenobius gigantella ([Denis & Schiffermüller], 1775)
Donacaula forficella (Thunberg, 1794)
Donacaula mucronellus ([Denis & Schiffermüller], 1775)
Acentria ephemerella ([Denis & Schiffermüller], 1775) water veneer
Scoparia subfusca Haworth, 1811
Scoparia pyralella ([Denis & Schiffermüller], 1775)
Scoparia ambigualis (Treitschke, 1829)
Scoparia basistrigalis Knaggs, 1866
Scoparia ancipitella (La Harpe, 1855)
Eudonia pallida (Curtis, 1827)
Eudonia alpina (Curtis, 1850)
Dipleurina lacustrata (Panzer, 1804)
Eudonia murana (Curtis, 1827)
Eudonia truncicolella (Stainton, 1849)
Eudonia lineola (Curtis, 1827)
Eudonia angustea (Curtis, 1827)
Eudonia delunella (Stainton, 1849)
Eudonia mercurella (Linnaeus, 1758)
Elophila nymphaeata (Linnaeus, 1758) brown china-mark
Elophila difflualis (Snellen, 1880)
Elophila melagynalis Aggasiz, 1978
Parapoynx stratiotata (Linnaeus, 1758) ringed china-mark
Parapoynx obscuralis (Grote, 1881)
Nymphula stagnata (Donovan, 1806) beautiful china-mark
Parapoynx diminutalis (Snellen, 1880)
Agassiziella angulipennis (Hampson, 1891)
Oligostigma bilinealis Snellen, 1876
Cataclysta lemnata (Linnaeus, 1758) small china-mark
Synclita obliteralis Walker, 1859
Evergestis forficalis (Linnaeus, 1758) garden pebble
Evergestis limbata (Linnaeus, 1767)
Evergestis extimalis (Scopoli, 1763)
Evergestis pallidata (Hufnagel, 1767)
Cynaeda dentalis ([Denis & Schiffermüller], 1775)
Metaxmeste phrygialis (Hübner, 1796)
Hellula undalis (Fabricius, 1781) Old World webworm
Pyrausta aurata (Scopoli, 1763)
Pyrausta purpuralis (Linnaeus, 1758)
Pyrausta ostrinalis (Hübner, 1796)
Pyrausta sanguinalis (Linnaeus, 1767)
Pyrausta despicata (Scopoli, 1763)
Pyrausta nigrata (Scopoli, 1763)
Pyrausta cingulata (Linnaeus, 1758)
Loxostege sticticalis (Linnaeus, 1761)
Uresiphita gilvata (Fabricius, 1794)
Sitochroa palealis ([Denis & Schiffermüller], 1775)
Sitochroa verticalis (Linnaeus, 1758)
Paracorsia repandalis ([Denis & Schiffermüller], 1775)
Paratalanta pandalis (Hübner, 1825) bordered pearl
Paratalanta hyalinalis (Hübner, 1796)
Sclerocona acutellus (Eversmann, 1842)
Ostrinia nubilalis (Hübner, 1796) European corn-borer
Eurrhypara hortulata (Linnaeus, 1758) small magpie
Perinephela lancealis (Denis & Schiffermüller, 1775)
Phlyctaenia coronata (Hufnagel, 1767)
Algedonia terrealis (Treitschke, 1829)
Phlyctaenia perlucidalis (Hübner, 1809)
Anania funebris (Ström, 1768)
Anania verbascalis ([Denis & Schiffermüller], 1775)
Psammotis pulveralis (Hübner, 1796)
Phlyctaenia stachydalis (Germar, 1822)
Ebulea crocealis (Hübner, 1796)
Opsibotys fuscalis ([Denis & Schiffermüller], 1775)
Nascia cilialis (Hübner, 1796)
Udea lutealis (Hübner, 1809)
Udea fulvalis (Hübner, 1809)
Udea prunalis ([Denis & Schiffermüller], 1775)
Udea decrepitalis (Herrich-Schäffer, 1848)
Udea olivalis ([Denis & Schiffermüller], 1775)
Udea uliginosalis (Stephens, 1829)
Udea alpinalis ([Denis & Schiffermüller], 1775)
Udea ferrugalis (Hübner, 1796) rusty dot pearl
Mecyna flavalis Caradja, 1916
Mecyna asinalis (Hübner, 1819)
Diplopseustis perieresalis (Walker, 1859)
Nomophila noctuella ([Denis & Schiffermüller], 1775) rush veneer
Dolicharthria punctalis ([Denis & Schiffermüller], 1775)
Antigastra catalaunalis (Duponchel, 1833)
Maruca vitrata (Fabricius, 1787) mung moth
Diasemia reticularis (Linnaeus, 1761)
Diasemiopsis ramburialis (Duponchel, 1834)
Duponchelia fovealis Zeller, 1847
Hymenia recurvalis (Fabricius, 1775)
Pleuroptya ruralis (Scopoli, 1763) mother of pearl
Herpetogramma centrostrigalis (Stephens, 1834)
Herpetogramma aegrotalis (Zeller, 1852)
Herpetogramma licarsisalis (Walker, 1859) grass webworm
Palpita vitrealis (Rossi, 1794)
Hodebertia testalis (Fabricius, 1794)
Diaphania indica (Saunders, 1851) melonworm
Diaphania perspectalis (Walker, 1859)
Agrotera nemoralis (Scopoli, 1763)
Conogethes punctiferalis (Guenée, 1854)
Leucinodes vagans Tutt, 1890
Sceliodes laisalis (Walker, 1859)

Pyralidae
Hypsopygia costalis (Fabricius, 1775) gold triangle
Synaphe punctalis (Fabricius, 1775)
Orthopygia glaucinalis (Linnaeus, 1758)
Pyralis lienigialis (Zeller, 1843)
Pyralis farinalis (Linnaeus, 1758) meal moth
Pyralis manihotalis Guenée, 1854
Pyralis pictalis (Curtis, 1834) painted meal moth
Aglossa caprealis (Hübner, 1809) small tabby
Aglossa pinguinalis (Linnaeus, 1758) large tabby
Aglossa dimidiata (Haworth, 1809) tea tabby
Aglossa ocellalis Lederer, 1863
Endotricha flammealis ([Denis & Schiffermüller], 1775)
Galleria mellonella (Linnaeus, 1758) wax moth
Achroia grisella (Fabricius, 1794) lesser wax moth
Corcyra cephalonica (Stainton, 1866) rice moth
Aphomia sociella (Linnaeus, 1758) bee moth
Melissoblaptes zelleri (de Joannis, 1932)
Lamoria anella (Denis & Schiffermüller, 1775)
Paralipsa gularis (Zeller, 1877) stored nut moth
Arenipses sabella (Hampson, 1901)
Anerastia lotella (Hübner, 1913)
Cryptoblabes bistriga (Haworth, 1811)
Cryptoblabes gnidiella (Millière, 1867)
Conobathra tumidana ([Denis & Schiffermüller], 1775)
Conobathra repandana (Fabricius, 1798)
Acrobasis consociella (Hübner, 1813)
Trachycera suavella (Zincken, 1818)
Trachycera advenella (Zincken, 1818)
Trachycera marmorea (Haworth, 1811)
Oncocera semirubella (Scopoli, 1763)
Pempelia palumbella ([Denis & Schiffermüller], 1775)
Pempelia genistella (Duponchel, 1836)
Pempelia obductella (Zeller, 1839)
Pempelia formosa (Haworth, 1811)
Salebriopsis albicilla (Herrich-Schäffer, 1849)
Sciota hostilis (Stephens, 1834)
Sciota adelphella (Fischer von Röslerstamm, 1836)
Selagia argyrella ([Denis & Schiffermüller], 1775)
Elegia fallax (Staudinger, 1881)
Elegia similella (Zincken, 1818)
Ortholepis betulae (Goeze, 1778)
Pyla fusca (Haworth, 1811)
Etiella zinckenella (Treitschke, 1832)
Phycita roborella ([Denis & Schiffermüller], 1775)
Pima boisduvaliella (Guenée, 1845)
Dioryctria abietella ([Denis & Schiffermüller], 1775)
Dioryctria schuetzeella Fuchs, 1899
Dioryctria sylvestrella (Ratzeburg, 1840)
Dioryctria simplicella Heinemann, 1863
Epischnia bankesiella Richardson, 1888
Hypochalcia ahenella ([Denis & Schiffermüller], 1775)
Myelois circumvoluta (Fourceroy, 1785) thistle ermine
Eurhodope cirrigerella (Zincken, 1818)
Apomyelois ceratoniae (Zeller, 1839) locust bean moth
Assara terebrella (Zincken, 1818)
Pempeliella dilutella ([Denis & Schiffermüller], 1775)
Pempeliella ornatella ([Denis & Schiffermüller], 1775)
Gymnancyla canella ([Denis & Schiffermüller], 1775)
Zophodia grossulariella (Hübner, 1809)
Nephopterix angustella (Hübner, 1796)
Mussidia nigrivenella Ragonot, 1888
Ancylosis cinnamomella (Duponchel, 1836)
Ancylosis oblitella (Zeller, 1848)
Nyctegretis lineana (Scopoli, 1786)
Euzophera cinerosella (Zeller, 1839)
Euzophera pinguis (Haworth, 1811)
Euzophera osseatella (Treitschke, 1832)
Euzophera bigella (Zeller, 1848)
Ephestia elutella (Hübner, 1796) cacao moth
Ephestia parasitella Staudinger, 1881
Ephestia kuehniella Zeller, 1879 Mediterranean flour moth
Ephestia cautella (Walker, 1863) dried currant moth
Ephestia figulilella (Gregson, 1871) raisin moth
Ephestia calidella (Guenée, 1845) dried fruit moth
Vitula edmandsii (Packard, 1864)
Vitula biviella (Zeller, 1848)
Plodia interpunctella (Hübner, 1813) Indian meal moth
Homoeosoma nebulella ([Denis & Schiffermüller], 1775)
Homoeosoma sinuella (Fabricius, 1794)
Homoeosoma nimbella (Duponchel, 1836)
Phycitodes binaevella (Hübner, 1813)
Phycitodes saxicola (Vaughan, 1870)
Phycitodes maritima (Tengström, 1848)
Apomyelois bistriatella (Ragonot, 1887)

Pterophoridae
Agdistis meridionalis (Zeller, 1847)
Agdistis bennetii (Curtis, 1833)
Agdistis tamaricis (Zeller, 1847) tamarisk plume
Oxyptilus pilosellae (Zeller, 1841)
Oxyptilus parvidactylus (Haworth, 1811)
Oxyptilus distans (Zeller, 1847)
Oxyptilus laetus (Zeller, 1847)
Buckleria paludum (Zeller, 1839)
Capperia britanniodactyla (Gregson, 1869)
Marasmarcha lunaedactyla (Haworth, 1811)
Cnaemidophorus rhododactyla ([Denis & Schiffermüller], 1775)
Amblyptilia acanthadactyla (Hübner, 1813)
Amblyptilia punctidactyla (Haworth, 1811)
Platyptilia tesseradactyla (Linnaeus, 1761)
Platyptilia calodactyla ([Denis & Schiffermüller], 1775)
Platyptilia gonodactyla ([Denis & Schiffermüller], 1775)
Platyptilia isodactylus (Zeller, 1852)
Platyptilia ochrodactyla ([Denis & Schiffermüller], 1775)
Platyptilia pallidactyla (Haworth, 1811)
Stenoptilia pneumonanthes (Büttner, 1880)
Stenoptilia millieridactyla (Bruand, 1859)
Stenoptilia zophodactylus (Duponchel, 1840)
Stenoptilia bipunctidactyla (Scopoli, 1763)
Stenoptilia islandicus (Staudinger, 1857)
Stenoptilia aridus (Zeller, 1847)
Stenoptilia annadactyla Sutter, 1988
Stenoptilia pterodactyla (Linnaeus, 1761)
Merrifieldia leucodactyla (Denis & Schiffermüller, 1775)
Merrifieldia tridactyla (Linnaeus, 1758)
Merrifieldia baliodactylus (Zeller, 1841)
Pterophorus pentadactyla (Linnaeus, 1758) white plume moth
Pterophorus galactodactyla ([Denis & Schiffermüller], 1775)
Pterophorus spilodactylus (Curtis, 1827)
Pselnophorus heterodactyla (Müller, 1764)
Adaina microdactyla (Hübner, 1813)
Ovendenia lienigianus (Zeller, 1852)
Euleioptilus carphodactyla (Hübner, 1813)
Hellinsia osteodactylus (Zeller, 1841)
Hellinsia chrysocomae (Ragonot, 1875)
Euleioptilus tephradactyla (Hübner, 1813)
Oidaematophorus lithodactyla (Treitschke, 1833)
Emmelina monodactyla (Linnaeus, 1758)
Emmelina argoteles (Meyrick, 1922)

See also
List of moths of Great Britain (overview)
Family lists: Hepialidae, Cossidae, Zygaenidae, Limacodidae, Sesiidae, Lasiocampidae, Saturniidae, Endromidae, Drepanidae, Thyatiridae, Geometridae, Sphingidae, Notodontidae, Thaumetopoeidae, Lymantriidae, Arctiidae, Ctenuchidae, Nolidae, Noctuidae and Micromoths

External links
"Systematic List". UKMoths. List of moths of Great Britain and Ireland

Moths
Britain